This article lists the outdoor warning sirens built by Biersach & Niedermeyer Co., Alerting Communicators of America and American Signal Corporation.

Biersach & Niedermeyer Co.

Alerting Communicators of America sirens

American Signal Corporation sirens

See also
 List of civil defense sirens

References

External links 
 American Signal website
 Alerting Communicators of America website (defunct)
 The Siren Board - Alerting Communicators of America category
 The Siren Board - American Signal Corporation category
Air Raid Sirens - 1992-1993 ACA-ASC Flyers

Sirens